Benjamin Taliaferro (1750 – September 3, 1821) was a politician and United States Representative from Georgia. He had served in the Revolutionary War, reaching the rank of captain. An attorney, he was later appointed as a judge of the county court and the Georgia Superior Court. He also served in the Georgia Senate and as a delegate to the state's constitutional convention of 1798.

Biography
Taliaferro was born in present-day Amherst County, Virginia, in 1750 to an Anglo-Italian family, the Taliaferros, who had settled in Virginia in the early 17th century from London. Having completed preparatory studies, Taliaferro served in the American Revolutionary War as a lieutenant in the rifle corps commanded by General Daniel Morgan. He was promoted to captain, participated in the Battle of Princeton, volunteered to serve in Lee's Legion, and was captured by the British at Charleston in 1780.

In 1782, Benjamin Taliaferro married Martha Meriwether in Virginia. The couple had nine children together. After his wife died, Benjamin married again, and had his tenth child with his second wife.

After the Revolutionary War ended, Taliaferro was among the pioneers who settled in Wilkes County, Georgia (1784). He was appointed a judge of the superior court. He established a successful tobacco plantation along the Broad River, becoming one of the largest slave holders in Wilkes County. He was elected to the Georgia General Assembly beginning in 1786. In the 1790s, he played an important role in resisting the state government's Yazoo land scandal. He engaged in at least one duel to defend his honor.

In 1795 Governor George Mathews appointed Taliaferro as major general of the Georgia Militia 3rd Division. He was elected to the Georgia Senate, after the state reorganized its government in 1789, and he served as senate president there from 1792 to 1796. He was a delegate to the Georgia state constitutional convention in 1798.

He was elected as a Federalist to the 6th United States Congress and then re-elected as a Republican to the 7th Congress, where he served from March 4, 1799, until his resignation in 1802.

He was later appointed as a judge of the Georgia Superior Court and a trustee for the University of Georgia. He died in Wilkes County on September 3, 1821.

Honors
Taliaferro County, Georgia was named in his honor.

Footnotes

References
 Retrieved on March 4, 2009
Carol Ebel, First Men: Changing Patterns of Leadership on the Virginia and Georgia Frontiers, 1642-181 (PhD diss., University of Georgia, 1996). 
George R. Gilmer, Sketches of Some of the First Settlers of Upper Georgia, of the Cherokees, and the Author(1855; reprint, Baltimore: Genealogical Publishing, 1965). 
Lee A. Wallace Jr., The Orderly Book of Captain Benjamin Taliaferro, 2d Virginia Detachment Charleston, South Carolina, 1780 (Richmond: Virginia State Library, 1980).
Smith, Gordon Burns, History of the Georgia Militia, 1783-1861, Volume One, Campaigns and Generals, Milledgeville: Boyd Publishing, 2000. ASIN:B003L1PRKI.

1750 births
1821 deaths
American Revolutionary War prisoners of war held by Great Britain
Georgia (U.S. state) state senators
Georgia (U.S. state) state court judges
Taliaferro County, Georgia
People from Amherst County, Virginia
Continental Army officers from Virginia
University of Georgia people
Benjamin
Georgia (U.S. state) Federalists
Federalist Party members of the United States House of Representatives
Democratic-Republican Party members of the United States House of Representatives from Georgia (U.S. state)
American slave owners